Pat Corley (June 1, 1930 – September 11, 2006) was an American actor who portrayed bar owner Phil on the CBS sitcom Murphy Brown from 1988 to 1996. He also had a recurring role as Chief Coroner Wally Nydorf on the television drama Hill Street Blues (1981–87) and supporting roles in a number of films, including Night Shift (1982), Against All Odds (1984), and Mr. Destiny (1990).

Early life
Corley was born Cleo Pat Corley in Dallas, Texas, the son of Ada Lee (née Martin) and R.L. Corley. He got his start in the entertainment business as a teenage ballet dancer for the Stockton Ballet where he performed for three seasons. While serving in the U.S. Army during the Korean War, Corley helped put on entertainment shows for the brass while stationed in France. After his honorable discharge, he entered Stockton College on the G.I. Bill where he met his future second wife, Iris Carter, a younger student, champion debater and a locally acclaimed actress.

Career
After moving to New York City he worked as a waiter, attended the American Theatre Wing, studied under Uta Hagen and auditioned for plays. Corley and his wife toured in summer stock in Indiana and New Jersey with his young daughter Troy in tow. His first Broadway appearance was in James Baldwin's Blues for Mr. Charlie, a production by the Actors Studio, where Corley had been accepted as a member. Early in his career he shared the stage with future stars Al Pacino and James Earl Jones in the Off-Broadway play The Peace Creeps. In the 1970s, Corley appeared in several Broadway productions including Of Mice and Men with James Earl Jones and Sweet Bird of Youth with Christopher Walken.

Corley's Hollywood career began in 1969 in TV with a small role in N.Y.P.D. and a few television commercials. His first feature film roles were in Gordon Parks' The Super Cops and the comedy Law and Disorder with Carroll O'Connor and Ernest Borgnine. He also appeared in Coming Home and in an early Oliver Stone feature, The Hand, with Michael Caine.

Corley appeared on dozens of TV shows, among the earliest of which were: The Wackiest Ship in the Army, Get Christie Love and Kojak. Other series on which Corley has guest-starred include Starsky and Hutch, Barnaby Jones, Hill Street Blues, Hart to Hart, St. Elsewhere, Simon & Simon, Murder, She Wrote, Magnum, P.I., Cagney & Lacey, Night Court, Moonlighting, L.A. Law, and Hey Arnold!. Corley also had roles in two mini-series, Roots and Fresno.  He provided the voice of Sheriff McGee in Tom Sawyer (2000).

Death
Corley died of congestive heart failure in September 2006 at age 76 at Cedars-Sinai Medical Center in Los Angeles, California.  His wife, actress Iris Corley, had died the year prior.

Filmography

 The Super Cops (1974) as Captain Bush
 Law and Disorder (1974) as Ken
 Get Christie Love! (1974, TV Series, Episode: Highway to Murder)
 Kojak (1974, TV Series, Episode: "Cross Your Heart and Hope to Die") as Mr. Miller
 Delvecchio (1976, TV Series, episode "Numbers") as Manny
 The Blue Knight (1974, TV Series, episode: "Throwaway") as The Man
 Roots (1977, TV Mini-Series) as Referee
 Audrey Rose (1977) as Dr. Webster
 Martinelli, Outside Man (1977, TV Movie) as Sally
 Alexander: The Other Side of Dawn (1977, TV Movie) as Marty
 The Quinns (1977, TV Movie) as Eugene Carmody
 The Bad News Bears in Breaking Training (1977) as Morrie Slaytor
 The Betty White Show (1977, TV Series, Episode: "Mitzi's Cousin") as TV Repairman
 The Night They Took Miss Beautiful (1977, TV Movie) as Roman
 Barnaby Jones (1977-1980, TV Series) as Sid Markham / Sam Powell
 Coming Home (1978) as Harris
 A Death in Canaan (1978, TV Series) as Judge Vincent
 Starsky and Hutch (1978, TV Series, Episode: "Moonshine") as Ben Meadows
 The Paper Chase (1978, TV Series, Episode: "The Seating Chart") as Plumber
 The Amazing Spider-Man (1978, TV Series, Episode: "The Con Caper") as IFMM receptionist
 And I Alone Survived (1978, TV Movie) as Kaminsky
 Family (1979, TV Series) as "Driver" / "Umpire"
 The Best Place To Be (1979, TV Movie)
 Nightwing (1979) as Vet
 The Onion Field (1979) as Jimmy's Lawyer #2
 Diary of A Teenage Hitchhiker (1979, TV Movie)
 Flesh and Blood (1979, TV Movie)
 The Last Word (1979) as Chief Norris
 The Two Worlds of Jennie Logan (1979, TV Movie) as Realtor
 The Rose (1979) as Police Chief Morrison
 The Gift (1979, TV Movie)
 The Waltons (1980, TV Series, Episode: "The Idol") as The Bartender
 Lou Grant (1979-1980, TV Series) as Organizer
 The Black Marble (1980) as Itchy Mitch
 City In Fear (1980, TV Movie) as Supermarket Manager
 On the Nickel (1980)
 Loving Couples (1980) as Delmonico Clerk
 Act of Love (1980, TV Movie) as Sgt. Waterson
 Mark, I Love You (1980, TV Movie) as Bucky Sims
 The Hand (1981) as Sheriff
 The Best Little Girl in the World (1981, TV Movie) as Store Manager
 True Confessions (1981) as Sonny McDonough
 Callie and Son (1981, TV Movie) as Deputy Sheriff
 Mr. Merlin (1981, TV Series, Episode: "The Cloning of The Green") as Roy Oakland
 Of Mice and Men (1981, TV Movie) as Carlson
 Darkroom (1981, TV Series, Episode: "Siege of 31 August") as Colonel / Sheriff
 Hart To Hart (1981, TV Series, Episode "The Hartbreak Kid") as Monty
 Flamingo Road (1982, TV Series, Episode: "Old Friends")
 McClain's Law (1982, TV Series, Episode: "What Patrick Doesn’t Know")
 House Calls (1982, TV Series, Episode: "Ducks of Hazzard")
 Hanky Panky (1982) as Pilot
 Kiss My Grits (1982) as Sheriff Joe Cozy
 Night Shift (1982) as Edward Koogle
 The Executioner's Song (1982, TV Movie) as Val Conlan
 Cagney & Lacey (1982-1988, TV Series) as Sheriff Craddock / Tom
 Hill Street Blues (1982–1986, TV Series) as Coroner Wally Nydorf
 The Powers of Matthew Star (1983, TV Series, Episode: "Matthew Star D.O.A") as Donzelli
 St. Elsewhere (1983, TV Series, Episode: "Release") as Norman Wyler
 The Fall Guy (1983, TV Series, Episode: "Spaced out") as Sheriff Nick Baker
 Starflight: The Plane That Couldn't Land (1983, TV Movie) as Joe Pedowski
 I Want To Live (1983, TV Movie) as Bartender
 Curse of the Pink Panther (1983) as Lt. Palmyra
 Bay City Blues (1983-1984, TV Series) as Ray Holtz
 Against All Odds (1984) as Ed Phillips
 Calendar Girl Murders (1984, TV Movie) as Lt. Tony
 Domestic Life (1984, TV Movie) as Coach
 Scorned And Swindled (1984, TV Movie) as Ty Jenkins
 Hawaiian Heat (1984, TV Series, Episode: "Missing In Hawaii") as Charlie
 Simon & Simon (1984-1987) as Sheriff Brian McKenzie / Don Burton / Mayor K.K. Drinkman
 Robert Kennedy & His Times (1985, TV Mini-Series) as Andy McLaughlin
 Scarecrow and Mrs. King (1985, TV Series, Episode "A Little Sex, A Little Scandal") as Detective Tuggey
 Moonlighting (1985, TV Series) as Farley Wrye / Frankie Tate
 Stormin' Home (1985, TV Movie) as Broker
 Stark (1985, TV Movie) as Wichita Police Chief Waldron
 Hardcastle and McCormick (1985, TV Series, Episode: "She Ain't Deep But She Sure Runs Fast") as Buzz Bird
 Silent Witness (1985, TV Movie) as Brad Huffman
 Murder, She Wrote (1986, TV Series, Episode: "Powder Keg") as Frank Kelso
 Magnum, P.I. (1986, TV Series, Episode: "A Little Bit of Luck...A Little Bit of Grief") as Dennis Mackenzie
 Joe Bash (1986, TV Series, Episode: "Tour of Duty") as Ernest Janowitz
 Stark: Mirror Image (1986, TV Movie) as Wichita Police Chief Waldron
 Falcon Crest (1986, TV Series, Episode: "The Stranger Within") as James Saunders
 Fresno (1986, TV Mini-Series) as Earl Duke
 A Year in the Life (1986, TV Mini-Series) as George Bilzarian
 The Christmas Gift (1986, TV Movie) as Bud Sawyer
 He's the Mayor (1986, TV Series) as Chief Walter Padget
 The Stepford Children (1987, TV Movie) as Sheriff Weston
 L.A. Law (1987, TV Series, Episode: "Pigmallion") as Uncle Willard Sabrett
 Poker Alice (1987, TV Movie) as Mccarthy
 CBS Summer Playhouse (1987, TV Series, Episode: "Day to Day") as Bob
 Mr. Belvedere (1988, TV Series, Episode: "Commentary") as Mr. Franklin
 J.J. Starbuck (1988, TV Series, Episode: "Cactus Jack’s Last Call") as Cactus Jack
 Night Court (1988, TV Series, Episode "Another Day in the Life") as Otis Edwards
 Murphy Brown (1988-1998, TV Series) as Phil the Bartender
 Mr. Destiny (1990) as Harry Burrows
 In Defense of a Married Man (1990, TV Movie) as Det. Brendan Bradley
 Carol Leifer: Gaudy, Bawdy, and Blue (1992, TV Movie) as Lucky Herb
 Saved By The Bell: Wedding In Las Vegas (1994, TV Movie) as Sheriff Myron Thorpe
 Murder One (1995, TV Movie, Episode: "Chapter Four") as Marvin Siegalstein
 All Dogs Go to Heaven 2 (1996) as Officer McDowell (voice)
 Coach (1997, TV Series, Episode: "It’s a Swamp Thing") as Jeb
 When Time Expires (1997, TV Movie) as TV car salesman, Becks Interface
 Walking Across Egypt (1999) as Sheriff Tillman
 Tom Sawyer (2000) as Sheriff McGee (voice)
 Hey Arnold! (2002, TV Series, Episode: On the Lam/Family Man) as Mr. Camacho (voice)
 Purgatory Flats (2003) as Roy
 Come Early Morning (2006) as Papa (final film role)

References

External links

Pat Corley at the University of Wisconsin's Actors Studio audio collection
Obituary at ABC News

1930 births
2006 deaths
American male film actors
American male voice actors
American male television actors
Male actors from Dallas
20th-century American male actors